The United Football League was a professional american football minor league that operated between 1961 and 1964. It had eight teams, primarily based in the Midwestern United States.

After the league folded following the 1964 season, the more ambitious owners formed the new Continental Football League. The more conservative owners, who wanted to continue as a regional Midwestern bus league, broke away to form the Professional Football League of America in February 1965.

The league was founded in 1961 as a minor league alternative to the National Football League and American Football League. Based in the Midwest, it drew many of its players from the Big Ten college conference.

Among its more notable feats, it became the first football league to operate teams in both the United States and Canada when it launched the Quebec Rifles in 1964, and it revived the names of the Cleveland/Canton Bulldogs and Akron Pros, two early-era NFL teams.

History

1961 season
 Columbus Colts  6–2–2
 Grand Rapids Blazers  6–3–1
 Indianapolis Warriors  6–3–1
 Cleveland Bulldogs  6–4–0
 Louisville Raiders  4–6–0
 Akron Pros  0–10–0

WESTERN DIVISION PLAY-OFF
Grand Rapids Blazers 24 Indianapolis Warriors 14

UNITED FOOTBALL LEAGUE CHAMPIONSHIP
Grand Rapids Blazers 20, Columbus Colts 7

1962 season
 Grand Rapids Blazers  9–3–0
 Indianapolis Warriors  9–3–0
 Wheeling Ironmen  8–4–0
 Toledo Tornadoes   6–5–1
 Columbus Capitols  6–6–0
 Louisville Raiders  4–7–1
 Cleveland Bulldogs  4–8–0 
 Chicago Bulls  1–11–0

WESTERN DIVISION PLAY-OFF
Grand Rapids Blazers 24, Indianapolis Warriors 20

UNITED FOOTBALL LEAGUE CHAMPIONSHIP
Wheeling Ironmen 30, Grand Rapids Blazers 21

1963 season
 Wheeling Ironmen 12–1–0 
 Toledo Tornadoes  10–3–0
 Cleveland Bulldogs  7–5–0
 Indianapolis Warriors  5–8–0
 Grand Rapids Blazers  4–9–0
 Syracuse Stormers  0–12–0

On November 28, 1963, the Syracuse Stormers played the Cleveland Bulldogs at MacArthur Stadium in a regular season game.

UNITED FOOTBALL LEAGUE CHAMPIONSHIP
Wheeling Ironmen 31, Toledo Tornadoes 21

1964 season
 Canton Bulldogs  12–2–0
 Charleston (WV) Rockets 11–3–0
 Indianapolis Warriors  10–4–0
 Wheeling Ironmen 7–7–0 
 Toledo Tornadoes 6–8–0 
 Quebec Rifles  5–9–0
 Grand Rapids Blazers  5–9–0
 Joliet Explorers  0–14–0

UNITED FOOTBALL LEAGUE CHAMPIONSHIP
Canton Bulldogs 19, Indianapolis Warriors 14

Teams

Toledo Tornadoes
A former Michigan semi-pro team moved to Toledo as the all pro Toledo Tornadoes in 1956, played in the America Football Conference then transferred to the United Football League. The Tornadoes primarily played at Waite Stadium. The league forced the team to close  due to debt in 1965.

See also
 American Football Conference (1959–1961)
 Continental Football League

References

 
Defunct American football leagues in the United States
Sports leagues established in 1961
1961 establishments in the United States
1964 disestablishments in the United States
Professional Football League of America teams